Gerson may refer to:

Given name:
Gerson von Bleichröder (1822–1893), Jewish German banker
Gérson Caçapa (born 1967), Brazilian former footballer
Gerson Goldhaber (1924–2010), German-born American particle physicist and astrophysicist
Gerson Guimarães Júnior, (born 1992), Brazilian footballer
Gérson Magrão (born 1985), Brazilian footballer
Gerson Mayen (born 1989), Salvadoran-American footballer
Gérson or Gérson de Oliveira Nunes (born 1941), Brazilian footballer
Gerson Rosenzweig (1861–1914), writer and poet
Gerson (footballer, born 1997) (Gerson Santos da Silva), Brazilian footballer
Gérson da Silva, (1965–1994), Brazilian footballer
Gerson Victalino (born 1959), Brazilian Olympic basketball player

Surname:
Dora Gerson (1899–1943), German Jewish actress and cabaret singer killed at Auschwitz
Felix N. Gerson (1862–1945), American newspaper editor
Georg Hartog Gerson (1788–1844), German surgeon in the King’s German Legion during the Napoleonic Wars
Horst Gerson (1907–1978) was a German-Dutch art historian. 
Jean Gerson (1363–1429), French scholar and theologian
John Gerson, deputy head of MI6
José Gerson Ramos (born 1981), Brazilian footballer also known as simply Gérson 
Marlene Gerson (born 1940), South African tennis player
Max Gerson (1881–1959), German physician, known for Gerson therapy, an alternative therapy for cancer and chronic diseases
Michael Gerson (1964–2022), newspaper columnist and former speechwriter and adviser to US President George W. Bush
Noel Gerson (1913–1988), American author
Victor Gerson, French resistance in World War II 
Wojciech Gerson (1831–1901), Polish painter and academic

See also 
 Gershon (disambiguation)
 Gershom (disambiguation)

Jewish surnames
German-language surnames